Herman Alex Veenstra (October 11, 1911 in Poerworedjo, Dutch East Indies – April 23, 2004 in Diemen) was a Dutch water polo player who competed in the 1936 Summer Olympics. He was part of the Dutch team which finished fifth in the 1936 tournament. He played five matches as goalkeeper.

See also
 Netherlands men's Olympic water polo team records and statistics
 List of men's Olympic water polo tournament goalkeepers

References

External links
 

1911 births
2004 deaths
Dutch male water polo players
Water polo goalkeepers
Water polo players at the 1936 Summer Olympics
Olympic water polo players of the Netherlands
People from Purworejo Regency